The State Symphony Orchestra of DPRK (SSO) is a symphonic orchestra in North Korea and the first classical music ensemble to be established there.

History

The SSO was established on 8 August 1946 with the name Central Symphony Orchestra. In January 1947, this orchestra reinforced members and incorporated with the State Arts Theatre following year. They participated not only their subscription concerts but performances of ballets and operas including the first grand opera in Korean peninsula People's Commanders composed by Sun-Nam Kim.

SSO (at that time called "Symphony Orchestra of the State Arts Theatre") became independent in 1956. In 1969, it combined with the Orchestra of the (North) Korean Arts Film Studio and recorded film scores. The SSO incorporated again with the Sea of Blood Opera Company in 1971.

In the 1970s, the SSO premiered many well-known orchestral works of North Korea, including "Arirang", Bumper Harvest comes in Cheongsan Plains, Dear House at my Hometown, Maiden on a Swing, Piano Concerto Korea is One, Violin Concerto Song of Nostalgia and Symphony The Sea of Blood.

The SSO became fully independent from other arts groups in 1980 and adopted its present name. In 1982, the SSO played Isang Yun's orchestral work Exemplum, in memoriam Kwangju for the first time in North Korea, in the presence of the composer.

The SSO received the highest honor of North Korea, the Kim Il-sung Medal, in May 2000.

Repertoire, concert venues and conductors

SSO is only one large orchestra of Western form in North Korea but include players of improved Korean folk wind instruments, instrumental and vocal soloists and composers for itself. They play chiefly their own concert hall named Moranbong Theatre in Pyongyang.

SSO's principal conductor is Byeong-Hwa Kim since 1969. The orchestra also plays under Jeong-Gyun Kim (associate principal conductor), Ho-Yun Kim (associate principal conductor), Gwang-Seong Choi (associate conductor), Mun-Yeong Heo (associate conductor) and other guest conductors include Il-Jin Kim, Yeong-Sang Han, Jeong-Rim Jo, Jun-Mu Lee, Hong-Jae Kim and Francis Travis. SSO's concertmaster is Gi-Hyeok Choi.

Collaboration with South Korean artists

In 1998, SSO played Arirang under South Korean conductor Beom-Hun Park in 'Isang Yun Reunification Concert'. Two years after, SSO visited South Korea for the first time. They played two own concerts and two 'unity' concerts with KBS Symphony Orchestra in Seoul. In 2002, SSO met again with KBS Symphony Orchestra in Pyongyang and performed together. In these concerts, SSO played first time with well-known soprano Sumi Jo, cellist Han-na Chang and other artists of South Korea.

Recordings
The State Symphony Orchestra has released two compact discs containing Isang Yun's orchestral, chamber and choral works via Japanese company Camerata in the 1980s. Since 2000, they have made their own CD series via Kwangmyong Music Company, North Korea's only recording company. They only recorded domestic works until 2003.

In 2005, they recorded the Seventh Symphony, which was composed by Dmitri Shostakovich for their 15th album released from KMC. It was subtitled as "Foreign Music Vol.1 (외국음악집 1)". It was not only the first CD ever released in North Korea which only contained Western classical music, but it also has longest playing time of any North Korean CDs.

See also

 2008 New York Philharmonic visit to North Korea
 Isang Yun Orchestra

External links
State Symphony Orchestra picture album at Naenara

North Korean orchestras
Musical groups established in 1946
1946 establishments in North Korea